KC Boutiette (born April 11, 1970) is an American speed skater from Tacoma, Washington, and a four-time Olympian.  He was first of the wave of inline speed skaters who made the transition from inline to ice in order to have a shot at going to the Olympics.

Biography
In 1993, he showed up at the Pettit National Ice Center in Milwaukee, Wisconsin, looking to improve his technique on inline skates, but ended up earning a spot on the team that would be sent to the 1994 Winter Olympics in Lillehammer, Norway.  Although he had been a champion inline speed skater for years, Boutiette at that time had no ice speed skating experience at all.  Nevertheless, within a few months he made the team.

Although Boutiette has never won an Olympic medal, he demonstrated to other American inline speed skaters that the opportunity was there if they would give it a shot.  Following in his footsteps were Apolo Ohno, Derek Parra, Jennifer Rodriguez (Boutiette's ex-wife), and Joey Cheek, who won seven medals at the 2002 Winter Olympics in Salt Lake City, Utah.  After 2002 he went out and hand-picked another former inline skater, Chad Hedrick, who went on to win three medals at the 2006 Winter Olympics in Torino, Italy, after switching to ice skating in 2003.  Now almost half of the Olympic team were inline skaters for whom he paved the way.  Boutiette skated in the team pursuit in the 2006 Olympics. 

In the Netherlands, Boutiette participated as a marathon speed skater for several years and in this period he won the Six Days of the Greenery twice in 2003 and 2004.  He wore the Brussels sprout suit for ten days in between 2003 and 2005, the second in ranking after Cédric Michaud. In total he won 23 speed skating marathons on artificial tracks. He also was the leader in the Essent Cup for two days, wearing the orange suit.

Records

World records 

Source: SpeedSkatingStats.com

Personal records

See also
 World Fit

References 

 US Speedskating profile

External links
 
 KC Boutiette at SpeedSkatingStats.com
 
 
 
 

1970 births
Living people
American male speed skaters
Speed skaters at the 1994 Winter Olympics
Speed skaters at the 1998 Winter Olympics
Speed skaters at the 2002 Winter Olympics
Speed skaters at the 2006 Winter Olympics
Olympic speed skaters of the United States
World record setters in speed skating
Sportspeople from Tacoma, Washington